The Confédération Européene de Billard (CEB) is the European governing body of carom billiards and is affiliated to the world federation UMB.

History 
The CEB was founding on 12 July 1958 in Geneva. Its predecessor was the Fédération Internationale de Billard (FIB). They and the Union Internationale des Amateurs d'Fédérations de Billiard (UIFAB) competed in 1957 to host the CEB European Three-cushion Championship, and thus two championships were held this year. The dispute had been settled the following year.

The CEB is responsible for the carom billiards sports in Europe in general, and its affiliated national associations.

Founding members 
The following 15 organizations are recognized as founding members of the CEB:
 DBB –  Deutscher Billard Bund
 ÖABV –  Österreichischer Amateur Billard Verband
 FRBBA –  Fédération Royale Belge de Billard Amateurs
 DACC –  Fédération Britanique de Billard
 DDBU –  Fédération Danoise de Billard
 FERAU –  Fédération Egyptienne des Amateurs de Billard
 FEB –  Fédération Espagnole de Billard
 FFB –  Fédération Française de Billard
 FIBA –  Fédération Italienne de Billard Amateurs
 FLAB –  Fédération Luxembourgeoise des Amateurs de Billard
 KNBB –  Fédération Royale Néerlandaise de Billard
 PZB –  Fédération Polonaise de Billard
 FPB –  Fédération Portugaise de Billard
 FSAB –  Fédération Suisse des Amateurs de Billard
 SCKK –  Fédération Tchécoslovaque des Amateurs de Billard

Actual members 
The following 31 organizations were by the 45th General Assembly in April 2009 in Giza / Cairo, members of the CEB:
 ABF –  Albanian Billard Federation
 BBF –  Bulgarian Billiard Federation
 BSVÖ –  Billard Sportverband Österreich
 CBA –  Croatian Billiard Association
 CBS –  Českomoravský Biliarový Svaz
 CBSF –  The Cyprus Billiards and Snooker Federation
 DBU –  Deutsche Billard-Union
 DDBU –  Den Danske Billard Union
 EFBS –  Egyptian Federation of Billiards Sports
 ΕΦΟΜ –  Greek Federation of Billiards
 FARB –  Fédération Algérienne de Rafle et Billard
 FBSS –  Federazione Biliardo Sportivo Sammarinese
 FFB –  Fédération Française de Billard
 FIBiS –  Federazione Italiana Biliardo Sportivo
 FLAB –  Fédération Luxembourgeoise des Amateurs de Billard
 FPB –  Federação Portuguesa de Bilhar
 FRBB –  Fédération Royale Belge de Billard
 FSB –  Fédération Suisse de Billard
 FSB –  Slovak Billiard Federation
 GSGM –  Türkiye Bilardo Federasyonu
 ISPA –  Israël Snooker & Pool Association
 KBS CG –  Karambol Savez Crne Gore
 KNBB –  Koninklijke Nederlandse Biljartbond
 KTBF –  Kıbrıs Türk Bilardo Federasyonu
 LBF –  Lithuanian Billiard Federation
 MABIK –  Magyar Biliard Szövetseg
 NBF –  Norges Biljardforbund
 RBF –  Russian Billiard Federation
 RFEB –  Real Federacion Espagñola de Billar
 SBF –  Svenska Biljardförbundet
 SBiL –  Suomen Biljardiliitto

Board composition 
Board composition

Federation structure

Timeline

See also 
 African Carom Confederation (ACC)
 Asian Carom Billiard Confederation (ACBC)
 Confederación Panamericana de Billar (CPB)

References

External links 
 Financial provisions for alignment of tournaments (PDF; 39 kB) (Stand vom 4. Mai 2012)

Carom billiards organizations
Sports organizations established in 1958
1958 establishments in Switzerland